Cassola is a surname of Italian origin. Notable people with the surname include:

 Arnold Cassola (born 1953), Maltese politician and author
 Carla Cassola (born 1947), Italian actress 
 Carlo Cassola (1917–1987), Italian novelist

See also 

 Casola (disambiguation)
 Cassola
 Cazzola (disambiguation)
 

Italian-language surnames